Jamul may refer to the following places:

 Jamul, California, U.S.
 Jamul, Durg, Chhattisgarh, India
 Jamul Mountains, in San Diego County, California, U.S.
 Rancho Jamul, Mexican land grant in present-day San Diego County, California, U.S.